Day of the Dead is the twenty-fifth compilation release benefiting the Red Hot Organization, an international charity dedicated to raising funds and awareness for HIV and AIDS. Featuring fifty-nine exclusive recordings of covers of Grateful Dead songs by a number of independent artists as a tribute to the band, the compilation was released on May 20, 2016, as five CDs, a limited edition vinyl LP box set, and as a digital download. John Carlin, the founder of the Red Hot Organization, was the executive producer for the album. The members of The National first performed with Bob Weir at his Bay Area studio in 2012 as part of the Headcount benefit The Bridge Session. The group's budding friendship with the Dead cofounder pushed them to record the massive Dead tribute.

It is the second compilation album produced by Aaron and Bryce Dessner of The National for Red Hot Organization, following 2009's Dark Was the Night, which has raised over $1.5 million for the organizations fighting AIDS to date.

A Day of the Dead live performance took place at the second annual Eaux Claires Festival on August 12–13, 2016. The performers, who all appear on the record, included Jenny Lewis, Matthew Houck (Phosphorescent), Lucius, Will Oldham, Moses Sumney, Sam Amidon, Richard Reed Parry, Matt Berninger, Justin Vernon, Josh Kaufman, Bruce Hornsby, Ruban Nielson, Aaron and Bryce Dessner and The National.

Track listing

Digital sequence

CD sequence

Disc 1
Touch of Grey
Sugaree
Candyman
Dire Wolf
New Speedway Boogie
Friend of the Devil
Black Muddy River
Morning Dew
Black Peter
Loser
To Lay Me Down

Disc 2
Box of Rain
Rubin and Cherise
Me and My Uncle
Cassidy
Uncle John's Band
Mountains of the Moon
Dark Star - (Cass McCombs, Joe Russo & Friends)
Nightfall of Diamonds
Transitive Refraction Axis for John Oswald
Playing in the Band
Brokedown Palace

Disc 3
Peggy-O
Garcia Counterpoint
Terrapin Station (Suite)
Clementine Jam
China Cat Sunflower -> I Know You Rider
Jack-A-Roe
Easy Wind
Wharf Rat
Going Down The Road Feelin' Bad
And We Bid You Goodnight

Disc 4
Ripple
Truckin'
Dark Star - (The Flaming Lips)
Stella Blue
Shakedown Street
Franklin's Tower
Eyes of the World
Help on the Way
Estimated Prophet
What's Become of the Baby
King Solomon's Marbles
If I Had the World to Give

Disc 5
Standing on the Moon
Ship of Fools
Bird Song
Brown-Eyed Women
Here Comes Sunshine
Cumberland Blues
Drums -> Space
Cream Puff War
Rosemary
High Time
Till the Morning Comes
Althea
Attics of My Life
St. Stephen (live)
I Know You Rider (live)

LP sequence
Touch of Grey
Shakedown Street
Loser
Jack-A-Roe
Peggy-O
Bird Song
Brown-Eyed Women
Sugaree
Help on the Way
Franklin's Tower
King Solomon's Marbles
Box of Rain
Friend of the Devil
Wharf Rat
Cassidy
Candyman
Clementine Jam
Playing in the Band
Eyes of the World
Terrapin Station (Suite)
Ship of Fools
Estimated Prophet
Morning Dew
Me and My Uncle
China Cat Sunflower -> I Know You Rider
If I Had the World to Give
Dark Star - (Cass McCombs, Joe Russo & Friends)
Nightfall of Diamonds
Dark Star - (The Flaming Lips)
Rubin and Cherise
Althea
Mountains of the Moon
Stella Blue
Standing on the Moon
To Lay Me Down
Uncle John's Band
High Time
Dire Wolf
New Speedway Boogie
Cumberland Blues
Black Peter
Easy Wind
Here Comes Sunshine
Rosemary
Drums -> Space
Transitive Refraction Axis for John Oswald
What's Become of the Baby
Garcia Counterpoint
Brokedown Palace
Till the Morning Comes
Attics of My Life
Cream Puff War
Truckin'
Going Down The Road Feelin' Bad
Black Muddy River
Ripple
And We Bid You Goodnight
St. Stephen (live)
I Know You Rider (live)

Personnel
 Created and curated by Aaron Dessner, Bryce Dessner
 Produced by Aaron Dessner
 Co-producer: Bryce Dessner, Josh Kaufman
 Music direction: Josh Kaufman, Aaron Dessner
 Co-curators: Scott Devendorf, Bryan Devendorf, Conrad Doucette
 Project manager: Tom Wironen
 Co-executive producer: Dawn Barger
 Executive producer: John Carlin

Charts

References

External links
 Official site

Red Hot Organization albums
2016 compilation albums
4AD compilation albums
Charity albums
Grateful Dead tribute albums